Horace Everett Hooper (December 8, 1859 – June 13, 1922) was the publisher of Encyclopædia Britannica from 1897 until his death.

Early life

Born at Worcester, Massachusetts, he left school at the age of 16, and after gaining experience in various book shops, founded the Western Book and Stationery Company at Denver Colorado. He sold books to the western states making use of the United States Postal Service.

Rights to and purchase of Encyclopædia Britannica

He moved to Chicago, Illinois in 1893 to join the firm of James Clark, publishers of cheap editions. He marketed their reprint of the Century Dictionary using mail order and credit by installment terms, to great success. He visited England in 1897 and saw that the 9th edition of Encyclopædia Britannica could be marketed in the same way. He also noted that The Times suffered flagging sales, and hit on the idea of using the latter to market the former — to their mutual benefit.

He secured the reprint rights to Encyclopædia Britannica and The Times reissued it. Within three months 10,000 sets were sold and within five years the total had reached 50,000. Hooper bought the copyright, and set about the production of eleven additional volumes to make the 10th edition, which was published by The Times in 1902–3.

The Times appointed Hooper as advertising manager, and in 1905 he set up the Times Book Club, managed by Janet Hogarth. After the purchase of The Times by Lord Northcliffe, Hooper left the company in 1908. He set about the production of the Encyclopædia Britannica Eleventh Edition which was published 1910–11. This was published in two blocks of volumes instead of the volumes appearing serially over a number of years.

Hooper established the Britannica Year-Book, the first volume being published in 1913. He produced the Handy Volume edition (1915–1916) specifically for mail-order. This was a photographic reprint of the 11th edition, and was often sold with an accompanying book case.

Sale of Encyclopædia Britannica
Hooper sold the copyright to Sears Roebuck in 1920 but oversaw the publication in 1922 of the 12th edition - three volumes covering the events of World War I with a reprint of the eleventh edition. It too was issued in the Handy Volume format.

References 
 Janet E. Courtney, Recollected in Tranquility, 1926. Chapter XIV concerns Hooper
 Encyclopædia Britannica, 15th edition, article  Hooper, Horace Everett.
Anon, The History of the Times,  vol 3,1947, pp 443–449 (portrait of Hooper facing p 444)
Denis Boyles, Everything Explained That Is Explainable: On the Creation of the Encyclopaedia Britannica's Celebrated Eleventh Edition, 1910-1911, 2016. Hooper is a prominent figure throughout.
Alexander Coleman and Charles Simmons, All there is to know, 1994, pp 17–24.

1859 births
1922 deaths
American editors
Encyclopædia Britannica
American publishers (people)